Jason Stanford may refer to:

 Jason Stanford (baseball) (born 1977), Major League Baseball pitcher
 Jason Stanford (actor) (born 1953), American actor
 Jason Stanford (consultant) (born 1970), communications director for Austin mayor Steve Adler
 Jason Gray-Stanford (born 1970), Canadian actor